Pennsylvania's 196th Representative District is located in York County and includes the following areas:

 Dover
 Dover Township
 Jackson Township
 New Salem
 North Codorus Township
 Paradise Township
 Spring Grove
 West Manchester Township (PART, Districts 02, 03, 04 and 05)

Representatives

References

196
Government of York County, Pennsylvania